Percy Barrett (born April 7, 1948) is an educator and former political figure in Newfoundland and Labrador, Canada. He represented Bellevue in the Newfoundland and Labrador House of Assembly from 1989 to 2007 as a Liberal.

He was born in Woody Island, the son of Sidney Barrett, and was educated at Memorial University and the Ontario Institute for Studies in Education. Barrett was a school principal and was also an administrator in adult education and continuing education programs. In 1968, he married Leona Penney. Barrett was a member of the provincial cabinet, serving as Minister of Works, Services and Transportation and as Minister of Labour.

Barrett was accused of overspending his constituency allowance while serving in the assembly and paid back funds in 2008 after he was sued by the province. An earlier police investigation found that there was insufficient evidence to proceed with criminal charges against Barrett in connection with the overspending.

References 
 

1948 births
Living people
Liberal Party of Newfoundland and Labrador MHAs
21st-century Canadian politicians
Members of the Executive Council of Newfoundland and Labrador
Memorial University of Newfoundland alumni